Barbara Hancock (born November 21, 1949) is an American actress and dancer. While she was a dancer with the Harkness Ballet, she appeared as a dancing character in five productions in television and film. She was nominated for the 1968 Golden Globe Award for Best Supporting Actress in a Motion Picture for her role as Susan the Silent in Finian's Rainbow.

Filmography
Tarzan (1968) as Minette, in episode "Trina"
Finian's Rainbow (1968) as Susan the Silent
Cry for Poor Wally (1969) as Betsy
The Night God Screamed (1971) as Nancy Coogan 
Fair Play (1972 television film) as Pearlie Purvis

References

External links

1949 births
Harkness Ballet dancers
American film actresses
American stage actresses
Living people
21st-century American women